Karlee Everist (born September 13, 1991, as Karlee Jones) is a Canadian curler from Bedford, Nova Scotia. She currently plays second on Team Christina Black.

Career
After growing up in Thunder Bay and skipping her own team, Everist moved to Nova Scotia and joined the Kelly MacIntosh rink at lead for the 2013–14 season. The team also included third Kristen MacDiarmid and second Jennifer Crouse. In their two tour events, the DeKalb Superspiel and the Dave Jones Mayflower Cashspiel, the team was unable to reach the playoff round. Despite this, the team had a strong showing at the 2014 Nova Scotia Scotties Tournament of Hearts, finishing 6–1 through the round robin. This qualified them for the semifinal where they beat Mary-Anne Arsenault 9–8. In the provincial final against Heather Smith, the team gave up three in the tenth end to lose 6–3.

Team MacIntosh, now known as Team Backman, found success on the tour the following season, winning the Lady Monctonian Invitational Spiel in Moncton, New Brunswick. They also played in the DeKalb SuperSpiel once again but were unable to qualify. At the 2015 Nova Scotia Scotties Tournament of Hearts, the team finished the round robin with a 4–3 record. They then beat Sarah Murphy in a tiebreaker before dropping the semifinal game to the eventual champions Team Arsenault. Kelly Backman left the team following the season, with third Kristen MacDiarmid moving up to skip and Sara Spafford coming in to play third for the 2015–16 season.

Team MacDiarmid played in four tour events during the 2015–16 season, reaching the semifinals of the Lady Monctonian Invitational Spiel and the quarterfinals of the Appleton Rum Cashspiel. They also played in the Royal LePage Women's Fall Classic in Kemptville, Ontario, not reaching the playoffs. The team was unable to qualify for the 2016 Nova Scotia Scotties Tournament of Hearts through the open qualifier, finishing 2–3. Everist left the team at the conclusion of the season.

After taking a season off, Everist joined the Emily Dwyer rink at third for the 2017–18 season. This arrangement lasted just one season, with Everist and lead Shelley Barker joining former teammates MacDiarmid and Backman the next season. The team made the playoffs in three of their four tour events this season, reaching the semifinals of the Dave Jones Mayflower Cashspiel and the New Scotland Clothing Ladies Cashspiel and the quarterfinals of the Lady Monctonian. At the 2019 Nova Scotia Scotties Tournament of Hearts, the team finished in a four-way tie for second place with a 4–3 record. They were able to beat Colleen Jones 11–5 in the tiebreaker before dropping the semifinal 8–6 to Mary-Anne Arsenault. Julie McEvoy took over skipping duties for Kristen MacDiarmid for the 2019–20 season. In their four tour events, they reached the playoffs twice. The team was not able to find success at the 2020 Nova Scotia Scotties Tournament of Hearts, finishing winless through their seven games.

Team McEvoy disbanded after just one season together. For the 2020–21 season, Everist and Barker teamed up with Christina Black and Jenn Baxter. In their first event together, the team won the 2020 The Curling Store Cashspiel. The 2021 Nova Scotia Scotties was cancelled due to the COVID-19 pandemic in Nova Scotia, so the Nova Scotia Curling Association appointed Team Jill Brothers to represent the province at the 2021 Scotties Tournament of Hearts.

Team Black won their first event of the 2021–22 season, The Curling Store Cashspiel, going undefeated to claim the title. They also reached the final of the Atlantic Superstore Monctonian Challenge, losing to the Andrea Crawford rink. In November, the team once again went undefeated to win the Tim Hortons Spitfire Arms Cash Spiel, defeating former teammate Jennifer Crouse in the final. At the 2022 Nova Scotia Scotties Tournament of Hearts, Team Black won all three qualifying events, winning the provincial title and securing their spot at the 2022 Scotties Tournament of Hearts. At the Hearts, Team Black finished the round robin with a 5–3 record, which was enough to qualify for the championship round. Along the way, they scored victories over higher seeded teams such as Alberta's Laura Walker and Manitoba's Mackenzie Zacharias. In their championship round match against Northern Ontario's Krista McCarville, Team Black got down 9–1 before coming back to make the game 9–8, eventually losing 11–8. This eliminated them from the championship.

Everist plays in the mixed doubles discipline with her husband Bryce Everist. The pair has represented Nova Scotia at the Canadian Mixed Doubles Curling Championship three times in 2018, 2019 and 2021. Their best finish came at the 2018 Canadian Mixed Doubles Curling Championship in Leduc, Alberta where the team just missed the playoffs with a 4–3 record. They also finished 1–6 in 2019 and 3–3 in 2021. Everist was also a part of the Nova Scotia mixed team that represented the province at the 2019 Canadian Mixed Curling Championship in Winnipeg, Manitoba. Her team, with skip Kendal Thompson, third Marie Christianson and second Bryce Everist finished 7–3 through the round robin and championship pools, reaching the playoffs. They then beat Quebec 5–3 in the semifinal before dropping the final 7–4 to Manitoba, earning the silver medal.

Personal life
Everist is employed as a pharmacist at the IWK Health Centre. She is married to fellow curler Bryce Everist.

Teams

References

External links

1991 births
Canadian women curlers
Living people
Curlers from Thunder Bay
Curlers from Nova Scotia
20th-century Canadian women
21st-century Canadian women
Sportspeople from Halifax, Nova Scotia
People from Bedford, Nova Scotia